The Survival of Molly Southbourne is a 2019 horror novella by Nigerian writer Tade Thompson. it is the sequel to The Murders of Molly Southbourne.

Plot 
In the wake of the events of The Murders of Molly Southbourne, a new Molly Southbourne — one who lacks the original's power of self-replication — tries to survive the people who want her dead.

Reception 
The book received several positive reviews. Publishers Weekly called it "terrifying and poignant", and noted that it "poses thoughtful questions about identity and what it means to be human."
Library Journal called it "captivatingly bloody" and "just as chilling as its predecessor."

A review from Booklist called it a story "that cross the borders between horror, dystopian tales, and science fiction."

References 

2019 British novels
2019 Nigerian novels
British horror novels
British thriller novels
Tor Books books